SATCOM or Satcom may refer to:

 Satcom (satellite), a fleet of early geostationary communications satellites
 Communications satellite

See also
 FLTSATCOM, a former U.S. Navy satellite system
 Satcom on the Move
 Satellite phone